Papianilla may refer to:
 Papianilla (wife of Tonantius Ferreolus), Roman noblewoman
 Papianilla (wife of Sidonius Apollinaris) (floruit 455), Roman noblewoman